Snailbait is the debut album of Azalia Snail, released in 1990 by Albertine Records.

Track listing

Personnel 
Adapted from Snailbait liner notes.
 Azalia Snail – vocals, guitar, cabasa, kalimba, zither
Musicians
 John S. Hall – vocals (12)
 Richard Hutchins – bells, bongos, chimes, gong, woodblock
 Heather Meredith – flute
 Andy Nelson – kalimba, zither

Release history

References

External links 
 

1990 debut albums
Azalia Snail albums